Mirzamohammadi may refer to:
 Mirzamohammadi-ye Bala
 Mirzamohammadi-ye Pain